Men Against the Arctic is a 1955 American short documentary film directed by Winston Hibler. It was part of Disney's People & Places series. It won an Oscar at the 28th Academy Awards in 1956 for Documentary Short Subject. It was also entered into the 6th Berlin International Film Festival.

Overview
The short film describes the icebreaker ships of the era, used to break through thick pack ice off the coast of Greenland. The narrator describes the processes through which helicopters perform reconnaissance missions to avoid the icebreakers encountering large icebergs and other obstacles. The difficultly in making large deliveries by ship to base stations, such as Thule, is shown through the film's dramatic filmography of Arctic glaciers and icebergs, highlighting too the remote nature of the work.

Cast
 Winston Hibler as Narrator (voice)

References

External links

1955 films
1955 short films
1955 documentary films
1950s short documentary films
American short documentary films
Best Documentary Short Subject Academy Award winners
Disney documentary films
Documentary films about the Arctic
Films produced by Ben Sharpsteen
Films produced by Walt Disney
Films scored by Oliver Wallace
Disney short films
Films with screenplays by Winston Hibler
Films directed by Winston Hibler
1950s English-language films
1950s American films